Ramshorn Peak is an  mountain summit located in Fremont County of Wyoming, United States.

Description 
The peak is situated approximately 16 miles east of the Continental Divide in the Absaroka Range. It is set in the Washakie Wilderness, on land managed by Shoshone National Forest. Topographic relief is significant as both the east and west aspects rise  in one-half mile. The nearest town is Dubois, Wyoming, 16 miles to the south-southeast, and the peak is a conspicuous landmark seen from U.S. Route 26 / U.S. 287. The mountain's name has been officially adopted by the United States Board on Geographic Names, and was in use in 1914 when published in an USGS bulletin. The first ascent of the summit was made July 13, 1960, by H. & Mrs. Kellogg.

Climate 
According to the Köppen climate classification system, Ramshorn Peak is located in an alpine subarctic climate zone with cold, snowy winters, and cool to warm summers. Due to its altitude, it receives precipitation all year, as snow in winter, and as thunderstorms in summer. Precipitation runoff from the mountain drains into tributaries of the Wind River.

See also
 List of mountain peaks of Wyoming

Gallery

References

External links 
 Weather forecast: Ramshorn Peak
 Climbing Ramshorn Peak: Selectpeaks.com

Shoshone National Forest
Mountains of Fremont County, Wyoming
Mountains of Wyoming
North American 3000 m summits